Kommunistische Partei may refer to:
 Kommunistische Partei Deutschlands (Communist Party of Germany)
 Kommunistische Partei Deutschlands/Marxisten-Leninisten (Communist Party of Germany/Marxists–Leninists)
 Kommunistische Partei Deutschlands - Roter Morgen (Communist Party of Germany (Roter Morgen))
 Kommunistische Partei Osterreichs (Communist Party of Austria)

See also
 Kommunistische Partij van Belgie (Communist Party of Belgium)